Apamea lutosa, the opalescent apamea, is a moth of the family Noctuidae. It is found in the northeastern United States, including New York and Indiana. In Canada it is found in Ontario, Quebec, British Columbia, Saskatchewan and Manitoba.

Larvae have been recorded on Elytrigia repens.

References

External links
NatureServe Species info
Catalogue of Life: Apamea Lutosa

Apamea (moth)
Moths of North America
Moths described in 1877